Bradycellus is a genus of beetles in the family Carabidae, containing the following species:

 Bradycellus alticola Britton, 1948 
 Bradycellus anchomenoides Bates, 1873
 Bradycellus angulicollis Jaeger, 1995 
 Bradycellus ardelio (Casey, 1914) 
 Bradycellus aridus (Casey, 1914) 
 Bradycellus assingi Wrase & Jaeger, 1996 
 Bradycellus atrimedeus (Say, 1823) 
 Bradycellus badipennis (Haldeman, 1843) 
 Bradycellus bartschi Wrase, 1998 
 Bradycellus bicolor Jaeger, 1998 
 Bradycellus brevitarsis Normand, 1946
 Bradycellus californicus (Leconte, 1857) 
 Bradycellus carolinensis (Casey, 1924) 
 Bradycellus caucasicus Chaudoir, 1846
 Bradycellus chavesi Alluaud, 1919 
 Bradycellus chinensis Jedlicka, 1953 
 Bradycellus conformis (Fall, 1905) 
 Bradycellus confusus Jaeger & Wrase, 1994 
 Bradycellus congener (Leconte, 1848) 
 Bradycellus crassicerus N. Ito, 1985 
 Bradycellus csikii Laezo, 1912
 Bradycellus curtulus Motschulsky, 1860
 Bradycellus decorus (Casey, 1914) 
 Bradycellus discipulus (Casey, 1914) 
 Bradycellus discrepans Jaeger, 1995 
 Bradycellus distinctus (Dejean, 1829) 
 Bradycellus elongatus Motschulsky, 1860
 Bradycellus excultus Wollaston, 1854 
 Bradycellus exstans (Casey, 1914) 
 Bradycellus festinans (Casey, 1914) 
 Bradycellus fimbriatus Bates, 1873 
 Bradycellus ganglbaueri Apfelbeck, 1904 
 Bradycellus georgei Lindroth, 1968 
 Bradycellus glabratulus Lafer, 1989 
 Bradycellus glabratus Reitter, 1894
 Bradycellus grandiceps Bates, 1873 
 Bradycellus harpalinus (Audinet-Serville, 1821) 
 Bradycellus heinzi Jaeger, 1990
 Bradycellus humboldtianus (Casey, 1924) 
 Bradycellus insulsus (Casey, 1914) 
 Bradycellus jaegeri Morita, 1997 
 Bradycellus kataevi Jaeger & Wrase, 1994 
 Bradycellus kirbyi (G.Horn, 1883) 
 Bradycellus klapperichi Jaeger & Wrase, 1994 
 Bradycellus koltzei Reitter, 1900
 Bradycellus laeticolor Bates, 1873
 Bradycellus laevicollis Poppius, 1908 
 Bradycellus larvatus (Casey, 1914) 
 Bradycellus lecontei Csiki, 1932 
 Bradycellus lineatus (Casey, 1914) 
 Bradycellus lugubris (Leconte, 1848)
 Bradycellus lusitanicus Dejean, 1829 
 Bradycellus lustrellus (Casey, 1914) 
 Bradycellus maderensis Mateu, 1958
 Bradycellus mons Habu, 1975 
 Bradycellus montanus (Casey, 1914) 
 Bradycellus nebulosus Leconte, 1853 
 Bradycellus neglectus (Leconte, 1848) 
 Bradycellus nepalensis Jaeger & N. Ito, 1995 
 Bradycellus nigerrimus Lindroth, 1968 
 Bradycellus nigriceps Leconte, 1868 
 Bradycellus nigrinus (Dejean, 1829) 
 Bradycellus nipponennis Jaeger & Wrase, 1994 
 Bradycellus nubifer Leconte, 1858 Usa 
 Bradycellus otini Antoine, 1959
 Bradycellus ovalipennis Jaeger, 1996
 Bradycellus picipes (Casey, 1914) Us
 Bradycellus plutenkoi Lafer, 1989
 Bradycellus provoensis (Casey, 1914) 
 Bradycellus puncticollis (Casey, 1914) 
 Bradycellus purgatus (Casey, 1914) 
 Bradycellus rivalis Leconte, 1858 
 Bradycellus ruficollis Stephens, 1828
 Bradycellus rupestris (Say, 1823) 
 Bradycellus saitoi Morita, 1997
 Bradycellus schaubergeri Jaeger, 1995
 Bradycellus schuelkei Jaeger & Wrase, 1996 
 Bradycellus secundus Wrase, 1998
 Bradycellus sejunctus (Casey, 1914) 
 Bradycellus semipubescens 
 Bradycellus sharpi Joy, 1912 
 Bradycellus socors (Casey, 1914) 
 Bradycellus suavis (Casey, 1914) 
 Bradycellus subcordatus Chaudoir, 1868 
 Bradycellus subditus Lewis, 1879
 Bradycellus supplex (Casey, 1914) 
 Bradycellus symetricus (Motschulsky, 1850) 
 Bradycellus tantillus (Dejean, 1829) 
 Bradycellus ventricosus Wollaston, 1864 
 Bradycellus verbasci Duftschmid, 1812
 Bradycellus veronianus (Casey, 1924) 
 Bradycellus wollastoni Wrase & Jaeger, 1996 
 Bradycellus yuloagshanus Jaeger, 1996
 Bradycellus yunnanus Jedlicka, 1931
 Bradycellus yushanensis N. Ito, 1985

References

Harpalinae